Komintern is a rural locality (a village) in Rayevsky Selsoviet, Davlekanovsky District, Bashkortostan, Russia. The population was 36 as of 2010. There is 1 street.

Geography 
Komintern is located 23 km southeast of Davlekanovo (the district's administrative centre) by road. Sultanovka is the nearest rural locality.

References 

Rural localities in Davlekanovsky District